Pierre Cressoy (born Pierre Jules Lazare Cresson; March 25, 1924 – October 31, 1980) was a French film actor.

Filmography

References

Bibliography
 Davis, Ronald L. Hollywood Beauty: Linda Darnell and the American Dream. University of Oklahoma Press, 2014.

External links

1924 births
1980 deaths
People from Vendôme
French male film actors